The Aminu Kano College of Islamic Legal Studies is a state government higher education institution located in Kano State, Nigeria. The current Provost is Balarabe A. Jakada.

Courses 
The institution offers the following courses;

 English
 Primary Education Studies
 Geography
 Arabic
 History
 Social Studies
 Hausa
 Physical And Health Education
 Early Childhood Care Education
 Special Education
 Islamic Studies
 Economics
 Political Science
 Computer Science
 Business Education

References 

Universities and colleges in Nigeria
Islamic universities and colleges in Nigeria